Xanthodaphne heterogramma is a species of sea snail, a marine gastropod mollusk in the family Raphitomidae.

Description
The length of the shell attains 25 mm.

Distribution
This marine species occurs in the Atlantic Ocean off Northern Brazil.

References

 Odhner N. (1960). Mollusca. Reports of the Swedish Deep-Sea Expedition 2 (Zoology, 22): 365–400, pls 1-2
 Sysoev A.V. (2014). Deep-sea fauna of European seas: An annotated species check-list of benthic invertebrates living deeper than 2000 m in the seas bordering Europe. Gastropoda. Invertebrate Zoology. Vol.11. No.1: 134–155 
 Gofas, S.; Le Renard, J.; Bouchet, P. (2001). Mollusca. in: Costello, M.J. et al. (eds), European Register of Marine Species: a check-list of the marine species in Europe and a bibliography of guides to their identification. Patrimoines Naturels. 50: 180–213.

External links
 MNHN, Paris: holotype
 

heterogramma
Gastropods described in 1960